Cora was a single-stage French experimental rocket. It was the largest rocket ever launched in Western Europe. It was primarily used for component testing in support of the multinational Europa Rocket, which was developed and produced by the European Launcher Development Organisation, the predecessor to the present day European Space Agency.

The first stage of the Cora was 5.5 metres long and had a diameter of 2 metres; when fully fuelled, it weighed 9.85 tonnes; the propellant was a mixture of nitrogen tetroxide and unsymmetrical dimethylhydrazine (UDMH). The entire rocket had a length of 11.5 metres and a takeoff weight of 16.5 tonnes. It was powered by a three-nozzle engine that produced 220 KN of thrust and had a specific impulse (in vacuum) of 280 seconds. A cylindrical black ring supporting four fins was attached to the rocket's base.

On 27 November 1966, the first launch of the Cora rocket was conducted at the CIEES missile range and launch facility at Hammaguir, French Algeria. On 18 December 1966, the second launch, which was considered to be a success, took place. On 25 October 1967, Core was launched from Biscarrosse, Nouvelle-Aquitaine, however, it was considered to be a failure.

References

Experimental rockets
Space launch vehicles of France